Franz Vitzthum is a German countertenor, a male classical singer in the alto vocal range, specialising in Baroque music. He was trained as a boy singer with the Regensburger Domspatzen and studied with Kai Wessel at the Musikhochschule Köln. He is a member of the Staatstheater Karlsruhe and the vocal quartet Stimmwerck.

References

External links
 Official website
 
 Franz Vitzthum maierartists.de
 Franz Vitzthum  Berlin State Opera 
 Franz Vitzthum aeolus-music.com
 Franz Vitzthum Carus-Verlag

Living people
German opera singers
Operatic countertenors
German performers of early music
Year of birth missing (living people)